Nail Polish is a 2021 Indian Hindi-language  legal thriller drama film written and directed by Bugs Bhargava Krishna. Produced by Pradeep Uppoor, Seema Mohaptra, Jahanara Bhagava and Dhirajj Vinodd Kapoor with the production house as Ten Years Younger Production. Starring Arjun Rampal, Manav Kaul, Madhoo, Rajit Kapur, Anand Tiwari and Samreen Kaur the film follows the trial of a famous social activist who is accused of raping and murdering two migrant children while also suspected of killing others. Nail Polish premiered on ZEE5 on 1 January 2021.

Cast
Arjun Rampal as Siddharth Jaisingh (Sid)
Manav Kaul as Veer Singh; ‘Ranjit’; ‘Charu Raina’
Anand Tiwari as Amit Kumar
Rajit Kapur as Judge Kishore Bhushan
Madhoo as Shobha Bhusan
Samreen Kaur as Charu Raina
Sameer Dharmadhikari as DCP Sunil Sachdev
Rushad Rana as Yashpal Sharma
Neha Hinge as Malthi Kumar
Pratibha Goregaonkar as Matron
Mansee Deshmukh as Maya Kawal
Deepak Chaddha as Dada Shah
Sukesh Anand as Harpal Phera
Shiv Kumar Subramaniam as Dr. Nandi

Reception
Anna M. M. Vetticad gave a positive review and said that the film "touches upon aspects of sexual violence rarely discussed in Hindi cinema or in Indian society at large." Shrikanth Venkatesh of Sify wrote: "Nail Polish is a gritty film and is gripping for the most part. The acting is generally top notch, with Arjun Rampal and Manav Kaul especially in fine form. Archika Khurana of The Times of India called it a "a compelling thriller which can be watched for its story and most importantly the outstanding performances." 

Shubhra Gupta of The Indian Express praised the film and wrote: "A few things are overstated, a couple of facts are fuzzily presented, but despite the occasional eye-roll, Nail Polish, buoyed by a wonderful performance from Manav Kaul, and ably supported by the rest, keep us engaged." Prathyush Parasuraman of Film Companion wrote: "If nothing else, this movie is a testament to how well-framed and well-acted films can elevate even the banal writing, even if it cannot entirely transcend the banality."

Soundtrack

References

External link

 Nail Polish on ZEE5

ZEE5 original films
2021 direct-to-video films
Indian courtroom films
Films about sex crimes
Films about social issues in India
2020s Hindi-language films
2021 thriller films